Total quality management (TQM) consists of organization-wide efforts to "install and make permanent 
climate where employees continuously improve their ability to provide on demand products and services that customers will find of particular value."  "Total" emphasizes that departments in addition to production (for example sales and marketing, accounting and finance, engineering and design) are obligated to improve their operations; "management" emphasizes that executives are obligated to actively manage quality through funding, training, staffing, and goal setting.  While there is no widely agreed-upon approach, TQM efforts typically draw heavily on the previously developed tools and techniques of quality control. TQM enjoyed widespread attention during the late 1980s and early 1990s before being overshadowed by ISO 9000, Lean manufacturing, and Six Sigma.

History
In the late 1970s and early 1980s, the developed countries of North America and Western Europe suffered economically in the face of stiff competition from Japan's ability to produce high-quality goods at competitive cost. For the first time since the start of the Industrial Revolution, the United Kingdom became a net importer of finished goods.  The United States undertook its own soul-searching, expressed most pointedly in the television broadcast of If Japan Can... Why Can't We?.  Firms began reexamining the techniques of quality control invented over the past 50 years and how those techniques had been so successfully employed by the Japanese. It was in the midst of this economic turmoil that TQM took root.

The exact origin of the term "total quality management" is uncertain.  It is almost certainly inspired by Armand V. Feigenbaum's multi-edition book Total Quality Control and Kaoru Ishikawa's What Is Total Quality Control? The Japanese Way.  It may have been first coined in the United Kingdom by the Department of Trade and Industry during its 1983 "National Quality Campaign".  Or it may have been first coined in the United States by the Naval Air Systems Command to describe its quality-improvement efforts in 1985.

Development in the United States
In the spring of 1984, an arm of the United States Navy asked some of its civilian researchers to assess statistical process control and the work of several prominent quality consultants and to make recommendations as to how to apply their approaches to improve the Navy's operational effectiveness.  The recommendation was to adopt the teachings of W. Edwards Deming.  The Navy branded the effort "Total Quality Management" in 1985.

From the Navy, TQM spread throughout the US Federal Government, resulting in the following:
The creation of the Malcolm Baldrige National Quality Award in August 1987
The creation of the Federal Quality Institute in June 1988
The adoption of TQM by many elements of government and the armed forces, including the United States Department of Defense, United States Army, and United States Coast Guard

The US Environmental Protection Agency's Underground Storage Tanks program, which was established in 1985, also employed Total Quality Management to develop its management style. The private sector followed suit, flocking to TQM principles not only as a means to recapture market share from the Japanese, but also to remain competitive when bidding for contracts from the Federal Government since "total quality" requires involving suppliers, not just employees, in process improvement efforts.

Features
There is no widespread agreement as to what TQM is and what actions it requires of organizations, however a review of the original United States Navy effort gives a rough understanding of what is involved in TQM.

The key concepts in the TQM effort undertaken by the Navy in the 1980s include:
"Quality is defined by customers' requirements."
"Top management has direct responsibility for quality improvement."
"Increased quality comes from systematic analysis and improvement of work processes."
"Quality improvement is a continuous effort and conducted throughout the organization."

The Navy used the following tools and techniques:
The PDCA cycle to drive issues to resolution
Ad hoc cross-functional teams (similar to quality circles) responsible for addressing immediate process issues
Standing cross-functional teams responsible for the improvement of processes over the long term
Active management participation through steering committees
Use of the Seven Basic Tools of Quality to analyze quality-related issues

Notable definitions
While there is no generally accepted definition of TQM, several notable organizations have attempted to define it.  These include:

United States Department of Defense (1988)
"Total Quality Management (TQM) in the Department of Defense is a strategy for continuously improving performance at every level, and in all areas of responsibility. It combines fundamental management techniques, existing improvement efforts, and specialized technical tools under a disciplined structure focused on continuously improving all processes. Improved performance is directed at satisfying such broad goals as cost, quality, schedule, and mission need and suitability. Increasing user satisfaction is the overriding objective. The TQM effort builds on the pioneering work of Dr. W. E. Deming, Dr. J. M. Juran, and others, and benefits from both private and public sector experience with continuous process improvement."

British Standards Institution standard BS 7850-1:1992
"A management philosophy and company practices that aim to harness the human and material resources of an organization in the most effective way to achieve the objectives of the organization."

International Organization for Standardization standard ISO 8402:1994
"A management approach of an organisation centred on quality, based on the participation of all its members and aiming at long term success through customer satisfaction and benefits to all members of the organisation and society."

The American Society for Quality
"A term first used to describe a management approach to quality improvement. Since then, TQM has taken on many meanings. Simply put, it is a management approach to long-term success through customer satisfaction. TQM is based on all members of an organization participating in improving processes, products, services and the culture in which they work. The methods for implementing this approach are found in the teachings of such quality leaders as Philip B. Crosby, W. Edwards Deming, Armand V. Feigenbaum, Kaoru Ishikawa and Joseph M. Juran."

The Chartered Quality Institute
"TQM is a philosophy for managing an organization in a way which enables it to meet stakeholder needs and expectations efficiently and effectively, without compromising ethical values."

Baldrige Excellence Framework 
In the United States, the Baldrige Award, created by Public Law 100–107, annually recognizes American businesses, education institutions, health care organizations, and government or nonprofit organizations that are role models for organizational performance excellence.  Organizations are judged on criteria from seven categories:
Leadership
Strategy
Customers
Measurement, analysis, and knowledge management
Workforce
Operations
Results

Example criteria are:
How do you obtain information on your customers’ satisfaction relative to their satisfaction with your competitors?
How do you select, collect, align, and integrate data and information for tracking daily operations?
How do you manage your workforce, its needs, and your needs to ensure continuity, prevent workforce reductions, and minimize the impact of workforce reductions, if they do become necessary?

Joseph M. Juran believed the Baldrige Award judging criteria to be the most widely accepted description of what TQM entails.

Standards
During the 1990s, standards bodies in Belgium, France, Germany, Turkey, and the United Kingdom attempted to standardize TQM.  While many of these standards have since been explicitly withdrawn, they all are effectively superseded by ISO 9000:

Legacy
Interest in TQM as an academic subject peaked around 1993.

The Federal Quality Institute was shuttered in September 1995 as part of the Clinton administration's efforts to streamline government.  The European Centre for Total Quality Management closed in August 2009.

TQM, as a vaguely defined quality management approach, was largely supplanted by the ISO 9000 collection of standards and their formal certification processes in the 1990s.  Business interest in quality improvement under the TQM name also faded as Jack Welch's success attracted attention to Six Sigma and Toyota's success attracted attention to lean manufacturing, though the three share many of the same tools, techniques, and significant portions of the same philosophy.

TQM lives on in various national quality awards around the globe.

See also
Capability Maturity Model Integration CMMI
Lean manufacturing
List of national quality awards
Malcolm Baldrige National Quality Award
People Capability Maturity Model
Zero Defects

Explanatory footnotes

References

Further reading
  (Originally published in 1982 as Quality, Productivity, and Competitive Position)

External links

 Example Baldrige Award criteria
 The American Society for Quality resource page on TQM
 The Chartered Quality Institute resource page on TQM 
 The Economist resource page on TQM

Business terms
Quality management